This is a list of elections that happened in India during 1975. This is also the year when Prime Minister Indira Gandhi declared a state of emergency, one of the consequences of which was the suspension of elections.

Legislative Assembly elections

Gujarat

Rajya Sabha elections

These people were elected and subsequently served from 1975 to 1981.

Gujarat

Sikkim
Leonard Soloman Saring – INC

West Bengal

References

External links

 Election Commission of India

1975 elections in India
India
1975 in India
Elections in India by year